Littleton High School is a public high school located in Littleton, Colorado, United States. It is a part of the Littleton Public Schools school district.

History

The first Littleton High School building was finished in 1920 and initially served 225 students. In 1935, funding was acquired to construct three new wings to double the floor space and reduce the overcrowding due to the increasing number of students.

In 1956-58, the original school building was converted into Grant Junior High School. Improvements were designed by architect Alfred Watts, including a one-story cafeteria with a kitchen and six additional classrooms. An annex was added in 1958 to provide space for a music room, shop, home economics rooms, and labs. The additions of 1956-58 were built in a modern 1950s style, emphasizing larger windows and different shades of brick. In 1958, a football field was added at the east end of the site and tennis courts were constructed near the corner of Littleton Boulevard and Windermere Street. The Grant Junior High building was later converted into use by the Littleton School District as administrative offices.

The current Littleton High School, located at 199 E. Littleton Boulevard, was completed in 1956. It was designed by Earl C. Morris and built by Mead & Mount. A 1958 addition added  of classrooms and was designed and built by the same companies for $87,875. In 1961,  of new classrooms were added for $1,235,000. Earl C. Morris also designed this addition, with general contracting work completed by Weaver Construction Company. Langfur Construction Co. completed remodeling behind the stage in 1968, with designs by Bourn & Dulaney. A new swimming pool was added in 1969 for $394,369. The architect was Nixon-Brown-Brokaw-Bowen, and the contractor was Hezlep Construction Co. A new  shop area was designed by Nixon-Brown-Brokaw-Bowen and built by Weaver Construction in 1979. That project went to Allred/Fisher architects and Van I. Warden general contractors. These additions more than doubled the original size of the high school. The gymnasium is one of few in the area to still have balcony seating.

In November 2015, the theater was remodeled and completed.

Academics
In 1994, Littleton High School was named one of eight "World Class Schools" in the US and Canada, selected by the National Association of Secondary School Principals.

Athletics

Athletic programs at LHS include baseball, men's and women's basketball, cheerleading, cross country, football, men's and women's golf, men's lacrosse, poms, men's and women's soccer, softball, swimming, men's and women's tennis, track and field, wrestling, and volleyball.

In 2005, the Littleton men's track team placed 2nd overall at the 5A state championship. They were led by  relay gold medalists Nate Yorks and Shane Cronin who won individual silver medals, 2nd only to 100m/200m state record holder, Jeremy Dodson. Yorks finished in 2nd place in the 100m dash and 200m dash, while Cronin finished in 2nd place in the 400m dash and  relay. Yorks and Cronin ran splits of 45.9 seconds and 47.0 seconds, breaking the Littleton High School 100m dash, 200m dash, 400m dash, and  relay records.

Performing arts

Littleton High school has a long history of exceptional performing arts in theater, band, and vocal music since its inception in 1907.

The drama program presents several productions each year, with auditions open to all students. These productions include a fall play and a winter musical. Additionally, students may have opportunities to audition for or work on crews for student-directed plays throughout the year.

The theater has been home to hundreds of productions since the school's inception more than one hundred years ago, including well known works such as Camelot, Taming of the Shrew, Oklahoma, Seussical, The Mystery of Edwin Drood, The Laramie Project, and All in the Timing. In the spring of 2008, the school housed the original play The Cliff's Edge, written, acted, and directed by the students of the senior Theater Company class of 2008, and End Process, written and directed by the 2009 senior Theater Company (auditions were open to anyone). Many of these performances have been recognized and reviewed by Colorado Backstage, a web theater critic site for professional productions across the state. In 2012, the theater department produced Legally Blonde: The Musical which received 10 nominations in the Bobby G Awards. In 2022, the theater department produced Into the Woods which was nominated for 4 Bobby G Awards and won 1 for Best Directing.

The LHS Instrumental Music Department consists of two concert bands (Wind Ensemble/Symphonic Band), one strings-only class (Chamber Orchestra), and a (jazz band).The department also includes a marching band, pit orchestra for musicals, and several smaller ensembles for various performances. The marching band currently competes in the 4A bracket under the direction of Don Emmons, and has performed shows such as Locomotion, Midnight in Transylvania, Medusa, The Pirates of Penzance, and Machines. In 2022, the marching band was able to score an 80.85 under the show “Words of Wisdom,” loosely based on Let It Be by The Beatles and was also the first in the Metro Denver area to skip state quarterfinals. This is also the current highest score held by the high school.

The LHS Vocal Music Department consists of one non-audition ensemble: Women's Ensemble; and six audition-only ensembles: Concert Choir, Troubadours, Syrens, and Vocal Jazz. Both the Concert Choir and Troubadours have performed in many distinguished locations, such as the King Center at Auraria Campus and Boettcher Concert Hall. The Vocal Jazz group, under the direction of Jim Farrell, is known throughout the state as an excellent high school jazz group, consistently winning state jazz competitions, the Chaparral High School High Plains Jazz Festival, UNC/Greeley Jazz Festival, and the Arapahoe County School District jazz showcase. It is also known for having at least one student qualify for the Colorado All State Jazz Group every year, and is the only high school to do so since the creation of the Colorado ASJ program. The vocal department is currently under the direction of Aimee Taylor.

The LHS Vocal Music Department and Instrumental Music Department offer students the opportunity to attend national and international music trips every three years. A few places they have traveled to include Germany and Hawaii. These trips allow students to perform in famous churches and buildings while getting to tour the respective state and country.

International Baccalaureate
In 1997, Littleton High School applied to become an International Baccalaureate Diploma Program School. After approval, the first class of 14 students graduated in 1999 and had a 100% passing rate: all students earned their IB Diploma.

Notable alumni

Molly Burnett, singer and actress on Days of Our Lives
Lynne Taylor-Corbett, dancer and Broadway choreographer, Tony award nominee.
Brad Corrigan, rock drummer, guitarist, and singer for the band Dispatch, also known as "Braddigan"
Dave Grusin, composer, arranger and pianist, winner of Grammy and Academy awards
Don Grusin,  jazz keyboardist, composer, and record producer, winner of Grammy awards 
Bob Holme, ski jumper, competed for USA at the 1992 and 1994 Winter Olympics, and the 1993 World Championships
Tim T. Kelly, media executive, film producer, and conservationist. President and CEO of the National Geographic Global Media group and of National Geographic Ventures.
Clint Longley, former NFL quarterback
Brooks Thompson, former NBA player with the Orlando Magic, Utah Jazz, Denver Nuggets, Phoenix Suns and New York Knicks; head NCAA basketball coach of University of Texas, San Antonio

References

External links
 Littleton High School webpage

Public high schools in Colorado
Littleton, Colorado
Educational institutions established in 1907
International Baccalaureate schools in Colorado
Schools in Arapahoe County, Colorado
1907 establishments in Colorado